The 2003 Ashfield District Council election took place on 1 May 2003 to elect members of Ashfield District Council in Nottinghamshire, England. The whole council was up for election with boundary changes since the last election in 1999. The Labour party lost overall control of the council to no overall control.

Election result
The results saw Labour lose their majority on the council after independents gained 12 seats and Labour lost 15 seats.

|}

7 Labour candidates were unopposed.

Ward results

References

2003 English local elections
2003
2000s in Nottinghamshire